The Crooked Web is a 1955 crime film noir directed by Nathan Juran and starring Frank Lovejoy, Mari Blanchard and Richard Denning.

Plot
Stan Fabian runs a drive-in restaurant with girlfriend Joanie Daniel, whose brother Frank turns up for a visit. Joanie has declined to marry Stan because he's strapped for cash, but Frank tempts him with a proposition, mentioning that he and a partner hid a stash of gold in Germany during the war.

Stan accepts an offer to help recover the gold for a cut of the loot. What he doesn't know is that Joanie and Frank are actually undercover cops. A rich businessman's son was apparently killed by Stan during a deal gone wrong, but the German police are unable to extradite him to charge him with a crime.

Frank pretends to shoot his partner, using blanks. He secretly meets with Berlin chief of police Koenig, pretending to be looking for the gold. Stan fears a double-cross, but confesses his wartime murder to Joanie, and is shocked to be placed under arrest.

Cast
Frank Lovejoy as Stanley Fabian
Mari Blanchard as Joanie Daniel
Richard Denning as Frank Daniel
John Mylong as Herr Koenig
Harry Lauter as Sgt. Mike Jancoweizc
Steven Ritch as Ramon 'Ray' Torres
Lou Merrill as Herr Schmitt

References

External links

 

1955 films
Film noir
Films directed by Nathan Juran
1955 crime drama films
Columbia Pictures films
1950s English-language films
American crime drama films
American black-and-white films